Frank B. Klepper (June 22, 1864 – August 4, 1933) was a U.S. Representative from Missouri.

Born in St. John, Putnam County, Missouri, Klepper moved with his parents to Mirabile, Missouri, where he remained for ten years, and attended the common schools.
He moved to Clinton County, Missouri, and engaged in agricultural pursuits.
He attended Baker University, Baldwin City, Kansas, and engaged in teaching for two years.  He was graduated from the law department of the University of Missouri in 1898, and was admitted to the bar the same year and commenced practice in Polo, Missouri.  He served as prosecuting attorney of Caldwell County 1900-1905.

Klepper was elected as a Republican to the Fifty-ninth Congress (March 4, 1905 – March 3, 1907).
He was an unsuccessful candidate for reelection.
He moved to Cameron, Missouri, in 1907 and continued the practice of law.
He also engaged in banking.
He served as prosecuting attorney of Clinton County 1916-1920.
He again engaged in the practice of law in Cameron, Missouri, until his death in that city on August 4, 1933.
He was interred in Evergreen Cemetery.

References

1864 births
1933 deaths
People from Putnam County, Missouri
University of Missouri alumni
Republican Party members of the United States House of Representatives from Missouri
People from Cameron, Missouri
People from Caldwell County, Missouri